Okcheon Yuk clan is one of the Korean clans. Their Bon-gwan is in Okcheon County, North Chungcheong Province. According to the research held in 2015, the number of Okcheon Yuk clan’s member was 22593. Their founder was  who was from Zhejiang. He was settled and naturalized in Silla from Tang dynasty in 927.

See also 
 Korean clan names of foreign origin

References

External links 
 

Korean clan names of Chinese origin

Yuk clans